HCDE can refer to:
 Harris County Department of Education - Houston, Texas
 Hamilton County Department of Education or Hamilton County Schools -  Chattanooga, Tennessee